Orthosia mys is a species of cutworm or dart moth in the family Noctuidae. It is found in North America.

The MONA or Hodges number for Orthosia mys is 10481.

References

Further reading

 
 
 

Orthosia
Articles created by Qbugbot
Moths described in 1903